Maharaja Krushna Chandra Gajapati Medical College and Hospital Brahmapur, Ganjam, Odisha is a government medical college and hospital that started functioning in 1962 as a medical college and 1966 as a hospital. Subsequently, the medical college and the attached hospital were renamed after renowned late Maharaja of Parlakhemundi, Ganjam, Krushna Chandra Gajapati. It also has a college of nursing, which is established in 1983. It is the first nursing college in odisha. Courses available in this college are basic bsc nursing, post basic bsc nursing and msc nursing. Recently in 2019 it introduced a new course CHO(community health officer). campus area of MKCG mch is about 162 Acres

Functioning
It operates with 23 clinical departments, 8 non-clinical and para-clinical departments and with 1190 beds. A tele-medicine unit, provided by the ISRO, is operational.

It imparts medical education to 250 undergraduate students, 116 post-graduate medical students, 2 DM (cardiology) and 2 DM (endocrinology) superspeciality students, 80 diploma students in medical laboratory technology and 30 diploma students in medical radiation technology.

MKCG Medical College and Hospital, being the only major medical institution in Southern Odisha, also serves as a referral hospital. A blood bank is in a separate building in the medical compound. Recently the building for Regional Diagnostic Centre was completed, and it is ready to start functioning with facilities for a variety of sophisticated diagnosis and investigation.

The hospital has two new buildings, dedicated to a trauma centre and an improved neurology department. Within the compound there is a forensic and toxicology department; a new, upgraded, mortuary, in addition to this there is a new orthopaedics building; a new paediatrics building; and a new medicine building. There has been much infrastructure development like the Central Library, New Casualty Department, Microbiology Department and Oncology Department.

The Central Library is sanctioned with a budget of 9 crore. The building is designed according to AIIMS style. It has five floors but only two are functional.

Residential quarters are provided on the campus for the teaching and non-teaching staff of the college and hospital.

This medical college has the largest campus of the government medical colleges in Odisha.

Undergraduate courses
MKCG offers the four and half year MBBS course with one year compulsory rotating internship in affiliated hospitals to a maximum of 250 students per year.

Admission to this college in MBBS course is extremely competitive and strictly on the basis merit after occupation by caste reservation. Out of 250, 38 seats are filled through all india quota of National Eligibility cum Entrance Test conducted by the NTA and the remaining 212 seats are filled through the state quota through a series of counselling. State quota students can apply through OJEE website.

Student life

Undergraduate hostels
There are 4 gents hostels and 3 ladies hostels on its campus for the students pursuing the MBBS course.  GH-1, GH-2 and GH-3 are the senior UG hostels and GH-4 is the newly inaugurated hostel for first year UG students.

House officer's hostel
There is a House Officer's Hostel inside the campus. Just beside the P.G hostel 2

Post-graduate hostels
There are now 3 PG hostels(PG-1,PG-2,New PG hostel) for men and one for women.

Sports facility
There is a large playground near men's hostel 2 in its campus that hosts annual athletic meet and sports events of the college. The campus has a basketball court near Gent's hostel 1, two volleyball courts, two outdoor badminton courts and one indoor badminton court.

References

External links
MKCG Medical College and Hospital, Berhampur
 http://www.mciindia.org/View_College_Details.aspx?ID=108
 http://www.newindianexpress.com/states/odisha/article124408.ece
 BCom Exam Admit Card 2020

Hospitals in Odisha
Medical colleges in Odisha
Education in Berhampur
Educational institutions established in 1962
1962 establishments in Orissa